Edit Maria Kindval (1866–1951) was a Swedish teacher, photographer, women's rights activist and suffragist. After teaching in various locations from 1886, in 1901 she trained as a photographer, opening her own studio in Storvik in 1902. In 1907, she founded the local Storvik branch of the National Association for Women's Suffrage (LPKR), later becoming a member of the association's central board. Kindvall was also politically active in the Swedish People's Association and in the Moderate Party.

Biography
Born in Varberg on 21 July 1866, Edit Maria Kindvall was the daughter of the bookshop owner Karl Axel Kindvall (1832–1880) and his wife Anna Charlotta née Lindqvist (born 1834). She was the third in a family of five children. After the father's death, in 1881 the mother moved with the children from Tranås to Linköping but Edit returned to Tranås where she probably trained as a teacher.

In 1886, Edit Kindvall moved to Finspång working as a teacher until 1889. After a further year in Tranås, she moved to Gothenburg, from 1895 to 1897 she taught in Stråtjära, Hälsingland after which she became a governess in Sundsvall until 1901.

She then decided to change her profession to that of a photographer, working with Carl Berggren in Arbrå as an assistant in 1901. The following year, she opened her own studio in Storvik which she managed until around 1909, apparently opening a branch in Norberg.

In support of votes for women, in 1907 she established the Storvik branch of the Women's Suffrage Association and also took part in suffrage meetings in Gästrikland, Dalarna and Hälsingland. She reported on these activities in the journal of the Allmänna Valmansförbundet, a moderate party in which she was also politically engaged.

Edit Kindvall died in Stockholm on 26 December 1951.

References

1866 births
1951 deaths
People from Varberg Municipality
People from Sandviken Municipality
Swedish women's rights activists
Swedish suffragists
Swedish schoolteachers
20th-century Swedish photographers
Swedish women photographers
Moderate Party politicians